Dr Richard Rosendorff (fl. 1875—1941) was a German lawyer, who worked in Berlin.

Publications
His has written the following books & articles:
 
 The New German Company Law and the English Companies Act, 1929
 Die rechtliche Organisation der Konzerne. Berlin/Vienna 1927. 209 S. - Seite 11-101 mit Bleistiftanstreichungen - Berlin, Spaeth und Linde, 1927. 209 S. OKart. (306-4-0573) Wichtige Schrift! Vortrag, gehalten von einem Berliner Rechtsanwalt und Notar.
 Die Reform des englischen Aktienrechts durch den Companies Act 1929. Ein Beitrag zur Reform des deutschen Aktienrechts - Berlin, Heymanns, 1930. VIII, 156 S. Hlwd (St.a.Titelrückseite).
 Das Internationale Steuerrecht des Erdballs. Zurich: Verlag fur Recht und Gesellschaft, 1936-39.
 "New German company law and the English directors". — Scot.Law R., N., 348-9.
 The British Year Book of International Law - 1921 German law receives just emphasis in articles by Dr. Rudolf Kahn, Dr. Richard Rosendorff, and Dr. E. Haskin.
 Was müssen die Aktionäre und Verwaltungen vom neuen Aktien-recht wissen?, Berlin et al.: Spaeth & Linde (1932).
 Treuhandgesellschaften und ihre Funktionen 
Window-dressing in German interwar balance sheets by Mark Spoerer (University of Hohenheim

See also
German company law
UK company law

Notes

References

Jurists from Berlin
German male writers
Year of birth missing
Year of death missing